Puzzle Pirates (also known as Yohoho! Puzzle Pirates) is a massively multiplayer online game developed by Three Rings Design (Later owned by Grey Havens LLC). The player takes the role of a pirate, adventuring on the high seas and pillaging money ("pieces of eight") from roaming enemy ships (human or computer-controlled). The mechanics of Puzzle Pirates are driven by puzzles. For example, to effectively sail a ship, players must play puzzle games representing work at the sails for speed, pumping bilge water to remove it from the ship, and carpentry to fix any damage the ship may take.

Puzzle Pirates is open-ended and community-driven. Over time, pirates can join a crew, progress in rank within that crew, buy and run sailing vessels and shoppes, and perhaps even become captain of a crew, royalty within a flag (an alliance of crews), or governor of an island. Islands are governed and shoppes are managed exclusively by players. From time to time, players are also called upon to help expand the game, whether it be new puzzles (developed on Game Gardens), island objects to be used on new oceans (servers), or artwork used for a variety of purposes in-game.

Players are encouraged to use pirate-themed words and phrases such as "Yarr!" and "Ahoy there, matey!" instead of "Hi", etc., and the same is done throughout the game; for instance, the tips which appear in the game's News, which is updated regularly, use terms such as "Jackanapes".

As of December 2008, there were 4 million pirates registered to the game.

On August 31, 2011, the game was made free-to-play on Steam. Support for an iPad platform was developed and released in 2013. Three Rings later announced the removal of the iPad application and ceased support of the platform in July, 2014.

On April 5, 2016, Three Rings Design announced that support for Puzzle Pirates would shift from them to Grey Havens, a company consisting of former Three Rings employees. The servers were unavailable for several hours in the early hours of April 5, 2016 PDT to facilitate the switchover. The servers came back up and the game continued as if nothing had happened.

Oceans and payment methods 
Players are able to play most of Puzzle Pirates for free. Payment methods differ across different servers (called "oceans") on which characters can be created. If playing on a doubloon ocean, players will have to use a virtual microcurrency called doubloons for access to most in-game functions, and in-game purchases will often carry a doubloon cost in addition to the regular cost in the primary in-game currency, Pieces of Eight (PoE). On subscription oceans, access to the entire game is included in the monthly subscription cost and in-game PoE purchases do not have an additional doubloon cost. For example, buying a specific in-game item may cost 5 doubloons and 5,000 PoE on a doubloon ocean, but only 5,000 PoE on a subscription ocean.

Subscription oceans 
The first subscription ocean opened on December 8, 2003, the official launch date of the game. Subscriber oceans are named after different shades of blue - the ocean that follows the subscription method of payment is known as Cerulean.

Subscription oceans cost US$9.95 per month, with discounts for long term purchases and old accounts. Free (unpaid) accounts have limits, however, such as restrictions on fancy clothing and "high-end" weapons, as well as the inability to perform certain functions reserved for higher pirate ranks.

An alternative method is to convert 42 doubloons into a month's subscription, known as a coinscription, which must be manually renewed each month. In May 2005, the game became available in retail stores, which includes a single month of play as part of the purchase price and a single-player mode where four puzzles may be practiced.

Doubloons do not exist at all on subscription oceans.

There is a test ocean known as Ice which is available to all players who are either current subscribers or have recently purchased doubloons. Though it is a test ocean, it follows the  subscription ocean model (paid subscribers have unrestricted access to all parts of the game).

Doubloon oceans 
On February 11, 2005, the first doubloon ocean was opened.  Doubloon oceans are named after shades of green; the current oceans are known as Meridian, Emerald, Opal (German-language), and Jade (Spanish-language).

On a doubloon ocean, items are purchased both with normal in-game currency (pieces of eight, abbreviated PoE) and a micropayment currency called doubloons. One must spend doubloons to execute the privileges of pirate/officer/captain rank, play most games without restriction, purchase most in-game items (such as boats, clothes, and weapons), create a new crew or flag, and perform other important tasks.  As of December 2005, doubloons can be purchased for US$0.20 to US$0.25 each (depending on quantity) or from other players for in-game PoE.

Those willing to pay extra real world cash for extra in-game money can buy many doubloons and sell them to other players for PoE. Those who wish to play for free can purchase the doubloons they want from those players who buy doubloons with cash. Such exchanges are usually done through the in-game doubloon exchange. This works like a commodity exchange marketplace, with a list of buy and sell offers; players can either post an order to wait, or fill the current best order. This effectively creates a pay-as-you-go model, where one can pay with either real world cash or both time and puzzle skills. The extra game-money does not translate directly into game-power; puzzle skills, and organizational skills are far more important than game money.

Doubloons can also be purchased in selected countries by reverse SMS billing, however, as charges are billed in foreign currencies, prices are often substantially higher than payment with a credit card or PayPal. Converting 42 doubloons into a month of subscription permits people who only have access to a mobile phone to play as subscribers.

You may spend $200 or the equivalent in pound sterling a month.

Family oceans 
On July 1, 2009 Three Rings released "family oceans" as an experiment. The first, and only Ocean, was the Crimson Ocean.

In this ocean, several features which are considered inappropriate or unwanted for children are disabled, including poker, hearts, spades, sinking, etc. It also has a chat filter which only allows words on an approved list of words to be spoken. The Crimson server was shut down permanently on March 31, 2011.

Ocean merge 
On December 8, 2011, the developers of Three Rings Design announced that the six English-speaking oceans would be merging into three oceans, with testing which began in early January 2012. The three new oceans would be named as follows;
Cerulean (Midnight and Cobalt)
Meridian (Viridian and Malachite)
Emerald (Sage and Hunter)
The merge was made official on January 31, 2012. A few last minute bugs made some bugfix updates necessary, but the new oceans were quickly stabilized.

Active oceans
, the ocean servers that are still working are:
 Cerulean - Subscription Ocean
 Meridian - Doubloon Ocean
 Emerald - Doubloon Ocean
 Jade - Doubloon Ocean (Spanish language)
 Opal - Doubloon Ocean (German language)
 Obsidian - Steam-exclusive Doubloon ocean
 Ice - Test ocean
All of the oceans average under 10 online players at any given time, except for Cerulean (average 20-30 players) and Emerald (300-500 players).

Puzzle descriptions 
Many of the puzzles featured in Puzzle Pirates bear resemblances to established puzzle games, with some changes in mechanics. The following list describes each puzzle game, as well as the game(s), if applicable, each was derived from.

Multiplayer puzzles 
Multiplayer puzzles can be played between two or more players, and may be wagered on. Sword fighting and Rumble are also played during a Sea Battle (against computer-controlled Brigands and Barbarians, respectively). Tournaments, funded by players and seeded by the software, are available and commonly played. Drinking, Sword fighting, and Treasure Drop were playable in tournaments until July 2005, while Rumble was added in April 2006.
Drinking is similar to PopCap's Alchemy game. 2 to 6 players must, in turn, select one of three pieces and place it on a board such that all pieces adjacent to the placed piece must match the new piece in either color or shape. A player may symbolically drink a piece instead, increasing the drunkenness of the player, and must do so if the player cannot place any piece. Players "pass out" (lose turns) when they become too drunk. Placing pieces scores some points for the player; completing a row or column scores more points for the player(s) with the most pieces in that line. The player with the highest score when a round is over (either when all spots on the board have been used, or when a set score is reached) wins that round. Drinking was overhauled at the end of June 2005 to include features such as kegs (bonus points for people who can maintain board control), mugs (which allow players to select one of 8 different rule variations), and the original rules simulated in the "Classic Drinking" ruleset.

Sword fighting is similar to Super Puzzle Fighter. Puzzle pieces consisting of two blocks, each of one of four colors, fall into a well The only exception is if you go on a SMH (sea monster hunt) then an extra color and breaker for that color drops. "Breaker" pieces, of the same color and depicting the same sword as the normal pieces, destroy all groups of similar pieces which they touch. Arranging pieces and destroying them sends pieces to the opponent, in the form of silver swords and blocks that eventually turn into normal blocks. The last player (or team of players) whose well entrance has not been blocked up wins. Brawling simply refers to teamed sword fighting duels, where two groups of 2 or more pirates puzzle against one another in a scenario similar to the sword fighting that occurs at the end of a sea battle. Players may also purchase swords for use in sword fighting. Each sword sends a different pattern of pieces to opponents. While more expensive swords tend to be more powerful, each one has both strengths and weaknesses. Swords include cleavers, stilettos, scimitars, falchions and others.  All new players start the game with a foil, the cheapest type of sword. But you may buy a sword with two different colors of enamel, the different colors affect the colors that drop when you send blocks to your opponent.
Rumble is similar to Puzzle Bobble; players launch multicolored balls in order to make groups of three or more. However, players may also "charge" balls up to make combos, adding to the opposing player's field. As they can for sword fighting, players can purchase weapons to enhance their rumbling. Players start with their only hands, but can purchase bludgeons which send different, more complex patterns of balls to their opponents. Bludgeons include gaffs, brass knuckles, hammers, belaying pins, and chains, among others. There is a variant of Rumble called Boxing that is played with only one ball instead of the usual two, but is otherwise identical.

Carousing Puzzles 
The introduction of Spades in November 2004 heralded the beginning of a new sub-category of competitive multiplayer puzzles classed as parlor games (later known as Carousing Puzzles). Played primarily at inns, these games traditionally include various card games, yet player versus player brawling and drinking is accessible via inns located on most islands.
Spades, Hearts, and Texas Hold 'Em Poker are played nearly identical to the original card games of the same name. In Spades, the only rule which players may decide is at what point value the game ends.  In Hearts, the players may decide at what point value the game ends and whether to have a no-pass round.  In Poker, the table size, buy-in, and limit may be set at table creation.
Treasure Drop is a two-player betting game resembling Avalanche, or a variant of pachinko. Players take turns dropping coins onto a series of levers. When the coin hits a lever, the lever flips, causing a new trail for another coin. Points are scored when coins reached the bottom of the lever system. The number of points scored depends on the number of coins reaching the bottom and where they land - typically the edges are worth much more than the center. A new game option is for holes to appear on the board, and if a coin goes into one, it randomly appears out another one on the board.

Crafting puzzles 
Six games exist that simulate production of goods. Shop owners and employees play these games to create the goods other pirates have ordered from the associated shops and stalls. So far, only five types of shops have puzzles associated with them as of March 2010: distilleries, apothecaries, shipyards, iron mongers and weaveries. The sixth game, foraging, is played from aboard a ship docked at an uninhabited island; ship owners can pay crew and jobbers to forage for them. Performance on non-existent craft puzzles is simulated.

On subscription oceans, each account receives 24 "hours" of labor per ocean each day, split evenly among multiple pirates on the same ocean.  On Doubloon Oceans, each pirate (avatar) may hold a Labor Badge to receive 24 hours of labor per day or a Deluxe Labor badge to receive 72 hours of labor per day, giving a potential 216 hours of labor per day per account. One completed crafting puzzle uses one hour of labor, and each crafted good requires a certain number of hours of labor to be completed.  Once a pirate's allotment of hours is used up, that pirate cannot contribute to the production of goods until the next day (although the puzzle can still be played, for practice).  Pirates who have jobs can contribute their labor to a shop without playing the puzzle, although they must play occasionally to keep their ratings from going dormant.

Distilling bears little resemblance to existing puzzle games. Four types of marble-like "bubble" pieces rest in a distilling vat: dark (bad), amber (neutral), light (good), and spicy (bonus). The relative location and type of two pieces determines if they may be switched; spice pieces may not be moved. Every ten seconds, the rightmost column of bubbles is evaluated. If the bubbles on average are more light than dark, that column is sent to the tank to form part of the brew. If more of the bubbles are dark on average, the column is burnt. Light-colored bubbles that are burnt come back into the puzzle as burnt light pieces; they move the same as light pieces but count against the value of that portion of brew. The puzzle is complete when twelve columns have been sent upwards.

The rum that distillers create fuels a ship's crew; without rum, a ship's crew performs poorly regardless of how well its players puzzle. Distilleries also create mugs, which affect the drinking game.
Alchemistry is a pipe-based game, most closely resembling PopCap's Rocket Mania both with roots in the early puzzle game Pipe Dream. Tanks of dye, in either two or all three of the traditional primary colors (red, yellow and blue), appear at the top of the screen, and a large network of pipes separates the tanks from flasks, which much be filled with specific dye colors in a certain order. The player must rotate the pipes to form a path from the correct tanks to the correct flasks, and a path connected to two tanks of different colors takes on the associated secondary color. For instance, orange is formed from red and yellow (again, based on the traditional primary color set). Pipes are bent or split at 60-degree angles, not right angles like in the aforementioned games.

Alchemistry is used to create dyes for cloth and paint for ships, as well as varnish and lacquer for furnishers. "Whisking potions" allow a player to move from island to island without a ship. Other potions allow restoration of missing body parts and various other cosmetic changes.

Shipwrightery is an original puzzle. The screen consists of a 5x5 matrix of squares and a set of six patterns. Each square in the matrix is one of five distinct pieces: iron ore, wood, rope, sail cloth, and gold. The patterns below the matrix are trominoes, tetrominoes and pentominoes with certain pieces in a certain location; each distinct pattern used in this puzzle is named after a specific part of a ship. The relative location and type of two pieces determines if they may be switched; gold pieces are immobile. Ship pieces are symbolically made by dragging a pattern onto the matrix, superimposing it upon a set of squares that match the pattern; gold pieces are wild in this instance. The puzzle is over when one of two conditions are met. If the player takes too long to match a pattern (the timer is represented by a rising tide, which falls when a pattern is matched), one of the six patterns is removed. When all patterns have been removed, the puzzle is over and the player penalized. If a certain number of patterns are completed and matched (tallied by a rising flag on screen), all pieces become immobile and the tide automatically rises; if the player has the opportunity to match any more patterns, they may do so for extra points.

Shipwrights make the ships which sail the seas, as well as bludgeons (such as ropes and belaying pins) for rumbling.

Blacksmithing, derived from logic mazes, creates swords and cannonballs.  The objective is to try to clear the board by hammering the pieces. It was born from a player created puzzle project named Knightfish as part of a Grand Crafting Puzzle Project. There are nine pieces - numbers 1 to 4, chess pieces (knight, bishop, rook and queen), as well as the rum jug, a wild piece. Each piece can be hit 3 times before it disappears; it may or may not change type upon being hit. Each piece changes color each time it is hit. Rum jugs are only awarded after every piece has been hit once (or more), and after every piece has been hit twice (or more). When hitting a number, the next hit must be that many squares away (horizontal, vertical or diagonal). When hitting a chess piece, the next hit must be able to be reached by that chess piece (according to its movement in chess). Except for the knight, it must also be on the border of the board. The rum jug, when hit, enables the player to play anywhere. Points are scored by chains of the same piece type played in a row, and more so by alternating sets of each of the four numbers (or chess pieces), then the chess pieces (or numbers). When no more moves are available, points are also scored dependent on how many strikes have been made (out of the maximum 108.)

Ironmongers make the cannonballs that ships fire in sea battles, as well as swords (such as foils, rapiers, and cleavers) for swordfighting.

Foraging is classified as a crafting puzzle because it uses up a pirate's labor supply; however, the end result is not the production of material goods, but rather tradable commodities such as fruits, gems, and gold.  In August 2008, Foraging became the newest puzzle in the game.  Somewhat similar to Bilging, and even more similar to Treasure Haul, players must rotate groups of four tiles to make columns or rows of three matching tiles.  Clearing tiles drops the ones above them, which may include small crates of fruit or larger boxes of more valuable goods.
Weaving is the latest crafting puzzle developed, and is playable in oceans as of March 2010. The objective of the game is to make groups of 4 or more similarly coloured pieces. The mechanics are quite different from other games; a loom pushes a new set of pieces along the board, until it stops when a column of pieces reaches the bottom. As you clear groups an indicator on the top-left fills up. Once it's filled, the puzzle session ends.

Weavers make the cloth that is then used by tailors to make different pieces of clothing. Cloth is also used by shipwrights to make the vessels' sails.

There are a few crafting jobs which do not yet have puzzles. They are:
Tailoring is used in the creation of clothes.
Furnishing is used to create items for a pirate's home.
Construction is used to build new buildings on an island.

Duty puzzles 
A number of puzzles are available only on a ship, and help to maintain that ship and increase its performance while sailing. Many crews insist on their members being well-experienced in these, if not the other, puzzles before promoting them to higher positions.
Sailing is similar to Dr. Mario. Blocks of 2 marbles, each of one of three colors (etched gold, marble gray, and blue, representing "rope, wind and wave" respectively), fall into the well one at a time; placing 4 units of the same color (including any stationary rectangular blocks of the same color) in a vertical or horizontal line destroys them. There are also "target platforms" that are destroyed when the target spots are filled with the correct marbles, and are the primary objective of the puzzle. While a beginner can do reasonably well by just trying to clear targets, experts can create long cascades that destroy two, three or even more target platforms in one huge chain reaction. Performing well on the Sailing puzzle causes the ship to move faster.
Rigging is an alternative to Sailing. The board is a hexagonal grid of pieces, which can be moved in straight lines in one of six directions. There are 6 pulleys, one of which will always be active, and 8 different pieces. The objective of the puzzle is to create large chains of pieces in front of an active pulley so they get pulled off the board. The active pulley changes in a clockwise direction after each move, regardless of whether a pull was made. 
Bilge pumping shares several mechanics with Bejeweled and Panel de Pon/Tetris Attack. A well, six blocks wide, is filled with assorted blocks colored with five, six, or seven distinct patterns. Blocks can be switched only with their horizontal neighbors, and lining three blocks of the same color in a row or column causes them to disappear. Destroying two, three or even four rows at the same time is particularly effective. Bilging removes bilge water from the ship, where the amount of bilge water decreases the efficiency of the sailing puzzle, both in and out of a  Sea Battle.
Navigation, strictly a duty puzzle, is an original game. A radial playing field of 24 points (three concentric circles, with a point at the eight cardinal and ordinal compass points: North, NE, East, SE, etc.) is marked in at least one point with a certain star. Stars appear from the outer ring and fall toward the center. The player must rotate the rings, completing lines of at least three similar stars if necessary, in order to place the indicated stars in the correct positions. Performing well in Navigation multiplies the productivity of the players working at Sailing, and also allows the navigator to eventually memorize league points on the map of the game world, so that in the future they can plot a course along them without the aid of a chart. Navigation can only be played by members of a crew at or above the rank of Officer, unless given special permission by an officer. On subscription oceans, the player can only navigate if they are a subscriber; on doubloon oceans the player needs a pirate's badge or higher to be ordered.
Carpentry is based on the arrangement of pentominoes. Four holes in the ship's body are presented, along with three random pentomino blocks. Every time a block is placed, another takes its place. Blocks can be placed such that they overlap, or lie partly outside the required hole; the more cleanly the holes are fixed, the more effective the player's efforts become. When a carpenter fills a hole so that no pieces overlap, or lay beyond the boundary of the hole, a "Masterpiece" is obtained. If a hole is ignored for too long, it will either grow in size or violently remove one piece from that hole. The player can flip the piece over or rotate it in 90 degree steps. An extra "grain" bonus can be obtained by only placing pieces whose grain runs horizontally or only placing pieces whose grain runs vertically. A "Nice Set" can be obtained, when a carpenter fills a hole with only one kind of piece. Sometimes, instead of a pentomino block, a bucket of putty will appear; putty can be used to fill any contiguous hole up to five squares in size. Performing well on Carpentry repairs damage to the ship, which in turn prevents bilge from seeping into the ship, which in turn moves the ship faster.
Patching is the newest duty puzzle, and serves the same purpose as carpentry. The patching board consists of a field of square pieces representing a torn piece of sail cloth. In order to fix the damage, pirates must maneuver the tears so they connect the spool of thread piece with the tie-off piece. After this is done, the spool can be activated, which will stitch up the tears in the sail cloth. Another board begins once the spool has been activated. 
Gunnery is similar to direction puzzles such as ChuChu Rocket!. The puzzle board is a ship's deck with four cannons. Blocks representing gunpowder, wadding, cannonballs and buckets of water move around the main deck. The player must place these blocks in the cannon in the correct order: gunpowder first, wadding second, cannonball last. This is done by placing arrows that further force pieces to go in certain directions. Water buckets clear out a cannon, and are necessary to clear a cannon that has been mis-loaded, or clean a cannon that has just been fired. When a cannon is fully loaded, the captain may fire it during battle. This puzzle can only be played by members of a crew at or above the rank of Pirate, unless given special permission by an officer.
The first half of a Sea Battle, also known as Battle Navigation, is a strategy game that's been compared to the board game RoboRally. When the navigating officer chooses to engage another ship or another ship engages them, a second map screen appears on his or her screen. The two ships are placed on the board, along with obstacles such as whirlpools, wind gusts and rocks, which affect the movement potential of both ships. Both captains are allowed thirty seconds to choose what action (forward movement, turning, cannon firing, grappling, or no action) to take for each of the next four moves; once time is up, the moves are enacted simultaneously. The "tokens" available to move the ship are proportional to the effectiveness of the sailors. Larger ships may only move three squares in a move, though they can fire on all four.  When one ship has grappled the other, a Swordfight or a Rumble takes place between the members of both ships, with all players starting the game with unusable garbage blocks determined by the amount of damage their ship took during the movement phase and whether or not their ship has any "rum". The side that defeats all opposing fighters receives a portion of the goods on the losing ship.
Treasure Haul is a puzzle similar to bilge but with a vertical cursor instead of a horizontal one. As this game only occurs for short periods of time, there are only three pieces and gems that clear rows. This puzzle can only be done in a brigand king flotilla, Atlantean raid, Haunted Seas raid, or blockade in which sinking is enabled while on top of a sunk ship for an entire turn. Once all the treasure has been removed from a sunken ship, the wreck disappears. If the ship that was hauling treasure leaves and returns to a port safely, the hauled treasure is divided among all the people that helped in the flotilla battle or blockade that is still on the ship. If the hauling ship is sunk or knocked out of the flotilla battle, raid, or blockade, all hauled treasure is lost.

Economy 
Puzzle Pirates features a market economy. Basic resources, such as wood and iron, as well as various herbs and minerals are produced by the game on most islands. Most colonized islands and some uncolonized islands have markets, which sell the local production to the highest bidder; others are harvested by "Merchants" which in turn sail the goods to the highest dockside buy offer (taking cost of delivery and distance into account).  On uninhabited islands, players may harvest fruit, and may sell them to either the government of other islands (if the government is buying those fruits) or privately owned businesses.  Commodities are processed by player-run shops, using player-supplied labor, into refined goods such as swords, ships and rum, or into intermediate items such as cloth or enamel.

Unlike most MMOGs, player-run shops and stalls determine what will be made at what price, with player employees that are hired to help with the crafting. While anyone can open a stall (full sized shops require an island governor to grant land), there is both an opening cost, as well as the need to acquire the commodities to construct the product, and the labor and time to actually construct.  In addition, there is a weekly tax which is paid out of the shoppe or stall. Tax amounts depend on the size of your stall, as well as an additional rate set by the governor. This is very different from crafting in other games, where any individual player may gather the materials and craft any item, usually instantly once you have the materials, without needing to own a shop or hire help. The best way to think about this is simple: The person who opens and runs a shop is not the crafter; they are the manager of an industrial production shop.  However, managers can become employees of their own shops and input to the labor needed to make the product.

To keep an ocean's economy going, most items age. When a certain amount of time passes, the item will have "aged" and it "crumbles to dust", disappearing completely. As an exception, tops and pants turn into rags if you have no other clothing of that type, and swords will turn into a stick if you have no other sword. Sticks do not age, although rags do.  To sell a stick, you must have another sword besides a stick.(Few people in the general market will actually buy a stick.) The conditions, in order from newest to oldest is: New, good, old.

With the exception of ships, which may be sunk in only certain circumstances, all items manufactured by players in Puzzle Pirates either decay or are consumed in everyday use. Cannonballs are shot during battle, rum is drunk during voyages,  swords, mugs and clothes decay through wear-and-tear, and furniture wears out when it is moved around to redecorate scenes (generally housing rooms and ship decks). This decay results in a steady demand for new items. Specifically, it forces on-going demand for raw commodities and player crafting labor, keeping shops in business. Without this, the eventual oversupply of finished items would result in "worthless game coin", as finished items are extremely common, and game coin has no meaning.

Game Gardens 
Three Rings Design has also created a site called Game Gardens, which hosts no fee tools for creating and playing Java games. Using the toolset requires knowledge of Java, but the toolset automates many basic game-related functions. Some Puzzle Pirates players use it to create demonstrations of new puzzle ideas for the game. Due to the tools being the same as those the designers use, importing a Game Gardens puzzle into Puzzle Pirates would not be difficult.

References

External links 
Puzzle Pirates Website

2003 video games
Massively multiplayer online role-playing games
Free-to-play video games
Independent Games Festival winners
Java platform games
Linux games
MacOS games
Massively multiplayer online games
Miniclip games
Multiplayer vehicle operation games
Naval video games
Puzzle video games
Three Rings Design
Video games about pirates
Video games developed in the United States
Webby Award winners
Windows games